Faizur Rahman may refer to:

 Faizur Rahman (police officer), a police officer killed in the Bangladesh Liberation War
 Faizur Rahman (writer), a Bangladeshi writer and educator